Janes is a surname.

Janes of JANES also may refer to:

 Jane's Information Group, a global open-source intelligence company
 Journal of the Ancient Near Eastern Society, or JANES
 The Janes, a 2022 HBO documentary about the Jane Collective

See also 
 Jane (disambiguation)
 Paul-Janes-Stadion, German stadium
 USS Henry Janes (1861), ship